Waveny Park (also known as Waveny House) is a park in New Canaan, Connecticut. The architect for the structure was William Tubby. Landscape design for the original residence was by landscape architect Frederick Law Olmsted, Jr.  The property was listed on the National Register of Historic Places in 2019.

The house was used for exterior shots for the fictional 'Cortlandt Manor' on the soap opera All My Children for many years; exteriors of the estate were also used in the 2004 remake film The Stepford Wives.

The park is bordered by Farm Road to the North, the Merritt Parkway to the South, South Avenue to the East and Lapham Road to the West. Over the years, numerous additional town structures have been built on parts of the property including New Canaan High School, Waveny LifeCare Network, an aquatic center, two public water supply towers, as well as paddle tennis courts. To be able to use some of these facilities, a nominal annual fee is charged. The Parks recreations are enjoyed by many people from all around Fairfield County.  

Lewis Lapham, one of the founders of Texaco and the man who built Waveny House, spent summers there with his family for many years. The Lapham family gave the Town of New Canaan most of the estate land in 1967 and sold Waveny House and its surrounding  to the Town for $1,500,000.

Actor Christopher Lloyd (Back to the Future, The Addams Family), born in Stamford, CT, lived in the Waveny mansion.

Pictures

References

External links
Waveny House page at Town of New Canaan website

Castles in Connecticut
Parks in Fairfield County, Connecticut
New Canaan, Connecticut
Houses in New Canaan, Connecticut
National Register of Historic Places in Fairfield County, Connecticut